John Fitzgerald and Johan Kriek were the defending champions but only Fitzgerald competed that year with Anders Järryd.

Fitzgerald and Järryd lost in the second round to Tomas Nydahl and Olli Rahnasto.

Ken Flach and Robert Seguso won in the final 7–6, 7–6 against Kevin Curren and David Pate.

Seeds
The top four seeded teams received byes into the second round.

Draw

Final

Top half

Bottom half

External links
 1989 Suntory Japan Open Tennis Championships Doubles Draw

Doubles